The men's Keirin in cycling at the 2004 Summer Olympics was contested by 22 cyclists.  A Keirin race consisted of eight laps of the track, or 2 kilometres.

Medalists

Results

First round
The 22 cyclists competed in three heats of seven to eight riders each.  The top two riders in each heat (six overall) advanced to the next round, while the other sixteen cyclists competed in the first repechage.

First repechage
The first round repechage consisted of three heats of five to six riders each.  The top two cyclists in each of the heats rejoined the winners from the first round in advancing to the second round.  The rest were eliminated from competition.

Second round
The second round consisted of two heats, with the twelve cyclists split into groups of six.  The top three riders in each heat advanced to the final, while the bottom three in each heat competed in the classification race for seventh to twelfth places.

Classification 7-12

Final

References

External links
Official Olympic Report

M
Cycling at the Summer Olympics – Men's keirin
Track cycling at the 2004 Summer Olympics
Men's events at the 2004 Summer Olympics